Adenomera heyeri is a species of frogs in the family Leptodactylidae, the southern frogs. It is native to South America, where it occurs French Guiana, Suriname, and northern Brazil. It probably also occurs in Guyana. This species was described to science in 2006.

This is not a very common frog, but it is not considered to be threatened. It occurs in several protected areas. It lives in the leaf litter of primary forest habitat. It is generally seen during the rainy season, when males come out and call. It is a nocturnal frog.

References

Adenomera
Amphibians described in 2006
Amphibians of Brazil
Amphibians of French Guiana
Amphibians of Suriname
Taxonomy articles created by Polbot